Dysauxes syntomida is a moth of the family Erebidae. It was described by Otto Staudinger in 1892. It is found in Kurdistan.

References

Syntomini
Moths described in 1892